Too is the second studio album by American skate punk band Fidlar, released September 4, 2015.

Singles 
The album's lead single "40 oz. On Repeat" was released on June 2, 2015, along with an official video.

The album's second single "Drone" and its video were released exclusively on iTunes and Apple Music on August 13, 2015 before being released to all retail formats the next day. The song is featured in the soundtrack to the video game WWE 2K17. 

"Why Generation" was promoted as the album's third single with the premiere of an animated music video composed of almost entirely emojis. The video was directed by Ryan Baxley and animated by Nolan Fabricius.

Promotional singles
"West Coast" was released on July 15, 2015 as the album's first promotional single, along with a music video  featuring performance footage. An original demo of the song was previously included on the band's 2012 EP Shit We Recorded In Our Bedroom.

"Leave Me Alone" was released on August 27, 2015 as the album's second promotional single, accompanied by a lyric video.

Critical reception 

Upon release, Too received generally positive reviews from music critics. At Metacritic, which assigns a normalized rating out of 100 to reviews from mainstream critics, the album received a generally favorable score of 76 based on 20 reviews. Consequence Of Sound ranked it #46 on their top 50 albums of 2015.

Track listing

Personnel 
Fidlar
 Zac Carper – vocals, guitar
 Elvis Kuehn – guitar, vocals
 Brandon Schwartzel – bass guitar, vocals
 Max Kuehn – drums, percussion

Production
 Alice Baxley – photography
 Ryan Baxley – design
 Paul Cossette – assistant engineer
 Richard Dodd – mastering
 Jason Hall – recording
 Jay Joyce – producer, recording
 Melissa Spillman – production assistant
 Caleb VanBuskirk – studio assistant

Charts

References 

2015 albums
Fidlar albums
Dine Alone Records albums
Mom + Pop Music albums
Wichita Recordings albums
Albums produced by Jay Joyce